Christkindelsmärik (Alsatian dialect meaning "Market of the Christ Child") is a Christmas market held annually in Strasbourg, France on the Grande Île near Strasbourg Cathedral and Place Kléber. It draws in approximately 2 million visitors each year and since the arrival of TGV service in Strasbourg in 2007, the number of visitors has been on the rise. Hotels can be booked a year in advance and some receive between 15 and 17% of their yearly income thanks to the Christkindelsmärik's visitors. It is considered one of the most famous Christmas markets throughout Europe. It is estimated that the city benefits of a 16 million Euros profit from this 38-day-long tradition. It is mostly famous for its fragrance of mulled wine.

History 
Strasbourg has been holding Christkindelsmärik around its cathedral since 1570, making it one of the oldest Christmas markets in Europe. 
The name "Christkindelsmärik" is of Alsatian origin, a low Alemannic German dialect which was the mainly spoken language in the Alsace until the 20th century. In many parts of south Germany and Austria christmas markets (German: Weihnachtsmärkte) are also called Christkind(e)l(s)markt (the spelling depends on the local dialect).

The market takes place annually, from 29 November to 31 December. It mainly takes place on Place Kléber, Place Broglie, Place du Marché aux cochons de lait and around the cathedral.

Planned bomb attack

There was an Al-Qaeda plan to bomb the Christmas market at the foot of the cathedral during the Christmas celebrations of 2000. This was discovered and foiled by authorities in December 2000.

Shooting attack

On 11 December 2018, a shooting and stabbing attack occurred at the Christmas market, killing five and injuring several. The attacker, Cherif Chekatt, was injured during a shootout with French soldiers during Opération Sentinelle near the scene and shot dead by police in Strasbourg on 13 December. The incident was classified as terrorism by authorities, who identified the shooter as a known extremist who had been tagged with a fiche "S" (S file or security file), the highest warning level for French state security.

The tree 

The Christkindelsmärik's Christmas tree, on Place Kléber, is traditionally of imposing height. The trees of the following years were only slightly less conspicuous:  in 2011, 2015, and in 2018;  in 2013, etc. At , the 2019 tree surpassed even its 2010 counterpart.

See also 
List of Christmas markets

References

External links 

Strasbourg, capitale de Noël (in French)
Christkindelsmärik, Strasbourg, on photo-alsace.com (captions in French)

Strasbourg, Christkindelsmarik
Strasbourg, Christkindelsmarik
Recurring events established in 1570
Tourist attractions in Strasbourg
1570 establishments in the Holy Roman Empire